The Story of Asya Klyachina (Istoriya Asi Klyachinoy, kotoraya lyubila, da ne vyshla zamuzh, also known as Asya's Happiness and Asya Klyachina's Story) is a 1966 Soviet movie. The artistic director was Mikhail Romadin. Shown briefly in 1967 under the title Asya's Happiness, it was not released widely until 1987.

Director Andrei Konchalovsky won the Nika Award for best director for this black-and-white movie.

Synopsis
Asya, a young collective farmer is in love with a driver by whom she is expecting a child. But he does not reciprocate her feelings. She persists, in spite of the advances of another suitor, then decides, lucidly and courageously, to raise her child alone.

Cast
Iya Savvina as Asya Klyachina
Gennady Egorychev as Chirkunov
Alexander Surin as Stepan
Mikhail Kislov
Ivan Petrov
Lyubov Sokolova as Maria, mother of Mishanka
Boris Parfyonov
Sergey Parfyonov
Nikolay Pogodin

External links

1966 films
1960s Russian-language films
1966 drama films
Soviet black-and-white films
Films directed by Andrei Konchalovsky

https://www.mosfilm.ru/news/?ELEMENT_ID=62352